The Southern Illinois Salukis football program represents Southern Illinois University Carbondale in college football. The Salukis are a member of the NCAA and compete at the Division I Football Championship Subdivision level (formerly known as NCAA Division I-AA). The Salukis are a member of the Missouri Valley Football Conference and play in Saluki Stadium on the campus of Southern Illinois University Carbondale in Carbondale, Illinois, which has a seating capacity of 15,000.

The Salukis are coached by Nick Hill, who was the starting quarterback for the Salukis in 2006 and 2007.

History 

The first official season of Southern Illinois football took place in 1913. Their first game was a win against Anna High School.

In 2006, the Salukis defeated Indiana University in Bloomington, Indiana, 35–28, becoming the first Missouri Valley Football Conference (MVFC) school to win against a Big Ten Conference member. In 2007, the Salukis were victorious against Northern Illinois University.  This marked the second consecutive year that SIU had beaten an FBS program.

In the 2000s, SIU set then-MVFC records with 99 consecutive weeks ranked in the top-25 and 14-straight MVFC wins.

Conference affiliations
 Independent (1913–1924, 1962–1976)
 Interstate Intercollegiate Athletic Conference (1925–1961) 
 Missouri Valley Conference (1977–1984)
 Missouri Valley Football Conference (1985–present) (known as the Gateway Football Conference until June 2008)

Postseason games 
The Salukis have appeared in two bowl games, compiling a 2–0 record.

Bowl games

Division I-AA/FCS playoffs
The Salukis have appeared in 17 playoff games in I-AA/FCS tournaments, compiling a record of 9–8. They won the I-AA national championship in 1983.

Championships

Conference championships 
 1947 – Illinois Intercollegiate Athletic Conference Champions
 1960 – Illinois Intercollegiate Athletic Conference Co-Champions
 1961 – Illinois Intercollegiate Athletic Conference Champions
 2003 – Gateway Football Conference co-champions
 2004 – Gateway Football Conference Champions
 2005 – Gateway Football Conference Co-Champions
 2008 – Missouri Valley Football Conference co-champions
 2009 – Missouri Valley Football Conference Champions

National championships 
 1983 – NCAA Division I-AA Champions, 43–7 win over Western Carolina

Players

Salukis in the NFL 
SIU has had 28 players drafted in the NFL Draft, including four since 2010. In total, 36 Saluki football players have gone on to play in the NFL. Some notable Salukis in the NFL are listed below.

 Kenneth Boatright  – Dallas Cowboys, DE (2013–2015)
 Brandon Jacobs – New York Giants, RB (2005–2013)
 Bart Scott  – Baltimore Ravens & New York Jets, LB (2002–2012)
 Carl Mauck  – San Diego Chargers, OL (1969–1981, coach 1982–2007)
 Damon Jones  – Jacksonville Jaguars, TE (1997–2001)
 Deji Karim – Houston Texans, RB (2010–2014)
 Houston Antwine  – Houston OIlers, DT (1961–1972)
 Jayson DiManche – Cincinnati Bengals, LB (2013–2017)
 Jewel Hampton – San Francisco 49ers, RB (2012–2016)
 Jim Hart  – St. Louis Cardinals, QB (1966–1984)
 Kevin House  – Tampa Bay Buccaneers, WR (1980–1987)
 MyCole Pruitt  – Tennessee Titans, TE (2015–Current)
 Sebron Spivey  – Dallas Cowboys, WR (1987)
 Amos Bullocks  – Dallas Cowboys, RB (1962–1964)
 Ray Agnew III  – Cleveland Browns, FB (2014–2015)
 Terry Taylor  – Seattle Seahawks, DB (1984–1995)
 Tom Baugh – Kansas City Chiefs, OL (1986–1989)
 Yonel Jourdain – Buffalo Bills, KR, RB (1994–1997) 
 Korey Lindsey – Indianapolis Colts & Dallas Cowboys, CB (2012, 2014)
 Chase Allen – Miami Dolphins, LB (2017 – Current)
 Jeremy Chinn - Carolina Panthers, LB/SF (2019-Current)
 Craig James - Philadelphia Eagles, CB (2018-Current)
 Ryan Neal - Seattle Seahawks, CB/SF (2018-Current)
 Madre Harper - New York Giants, CB (2019-Current)

All-Americans 
Cornell Craig is the school's all-time leading receiver and first receiver in school history to earn consensus All-American honors (1999).  His senior season he led the nation in receiving with 77 receptions for 1,419 yards and 15 touchdowns.  He also amassed over 2,000 all-purpose yards as a senior.  His career numbers (all Saluki records) are 207 receptions, 3,508 yards, and 37 touchdowns.  He was inducted into the SIU Athletic Hall of Fame in 2008 and is also honored on Missouri Valley Conference's 25th anniversary team along with three other Salukis.

Home venue 

SIU Football plays at the 15,000-seat Saluki Stadium, which replaced McAndrew Stadium, the home of Saluki Football since 1938. Saluki Stadium opened on September 2, 2010 when a sellout crowd of 15,200 watched the Salukis defeat Quincy 70–7.

The Saluki Stadium is part of the university's larger athletic facilities plan, known as "Saluki Way," a comprehensive plan to renovate and restructure the campus athletic facilities.

See also 
 Southern Illinois Salukis

References

External links
 

 
1913 establishments in Illinois
American football teams established in 1913